Terror of Tallahassee is an annual haunted attraction that opens every October in Tallahassee, Florida. With a performance area spanning more than  [1], it is one of the largest haunts in Florida. Unlike the corporate haunts with which it competes, Terror of Tallahassee does not admit patrons in a continuous line, but rather, in small groups. It also forgoes modern animatronics in favor of elaborate illusions, gruesome special effects, and a large cast of performers [1]. “Monsters, murderers, and madmen menace isolated customers as they try to traverse the long, twisting passages in the dark" [2]. Because of the intense scares, it is rated PG-13 and parents are cautioned against sending their kids [3].

History

Three giant warehouses make up the main building. They were originally part of an F-R-M grain depot built in 1950, but it was closed for a number of years before the property sold in 1999. The new owners gutted the steel building and rebuilt the interior into a giant maze with secret passages for the staff to surprise patrons. It was opened as Nightmares Haunted House in September 2000. It lasted two seasons before closing in 2001. It reopened in 2002 as Bloodlines Haunted House, but again closed. It reopened under new management in 2003 as Terror of Tallahassee and has grown ever since [4].

Spook Show Influence

Many of the special effects used at the Terror of Tallahassee originated in the traveling spook shows of yesteryear [5]. During the mid-20th century, magicians including Bill Neff, Jack Baker, Ray-mond Corbin, and Phillip Morris spellbound millions with black magic shows held in movie theaters at midnight. Their dark performances would feature decapitations, cremations, disintegrations, and similar macabre illusions [6]. Such magicians were called “Ghost Masters,” but the Spook Shows slowly disappeared in the 1970s as older theaters were closed and rebuilt without stages. Kurt Kuersteiner, the managing director at Terror of Tallahassee, traveled the country to meet the surviving Ghost Masters in 2005 while directing a documentary on their craft. As a result, many of the classic illusions they pioneered have been resurrected at the haunt [7].

Sunland Asylum

Another influence on the attraction was Tallahassee's legendary Sunland hospital [8]. Closed in the 1980s, it was originally built as the W.T. Edwards Tuberculosis Hospital, where many T.B. patients were quarantined until their death. It was closed and reopened in the 1968 as Sunland, a hospital housing children with mental disabilities. It became infamous for patient neglect and allegations of cruel and “sub-human” treatment.  The dilapidated building was closed for good in 1983 and was widely believed to be haunted. The controversial hospital and its unfortunate inhabitants are recreated in a segment of the haunt. It features equipment salvaged from the hospital before it was demolished in 2006 and further boasts, “(that) the spirits came along for the ride at no extra charge!” [9].

Spine Tingler

The Terror of Tallahassee is also the first public testing facility for the “Spine Tingler” [10], a specially designed rotary woofer that reproduces the subsonic sound spectrum (0 to 20 Hz). Although most of the sound is too low for humans to hear, they can subliminally detect it as the air pressure in the building is affected  (see: Infrasound). Advocates claim it “tingles the nerves” [11] and enhances the feelings of a supernatural experience.

Community Theater

Terror of Tallahassee is staffed by an army of volunteers, much like a community theater. Many of the actors return year after year. Most of the props, illusions and scenes are custom designed and built from scratch by the same performers [12]. Although the building is closed eleven months out of the year, the staff continues to build and modify it during the off-season. Management boasts that this provides a unique experience not found anywhere else.

Future Fate

Since the first year it opened, Terror of Tallahassee has operated under the shadow of the Gaines Street Revitalization Project. The original goals of the project threatened to demolish the haunt in order to expand the road beside it, but new plans in 2009 called for reducing the width of Gaines Street instead [13]. However, other changing goals of the project and the resulting gentrification continued to threaten the long-term prospects of the attraction at its original location. UPDATE: The property was sold and demolished in 2014. The actual haunt, however, moved a half mile away to 1408 Lake Bradford Road and continues to operate every October at a giant,  abandoned stone cutting factory.

Influence
The original haunt's location on Gaines street (along with many of the original performers) was photographed and used as the backdrop for the trading card series,

External links
Terror of Tallahassee Webpage

References

1.	Norbert, Grace. “The Terror of Tallahassee haunted house gets bigger and better each year” [link to: http://www.monsterwax.com/fsview2010.html] FSView 2010-10-28.

2.	“Lights Out Night” [link to: http://www.monsterwax.com/lightsoutTOT.html] Monsterwax.com. Retrieved 20 November 2010.

3.	“Warning” [link to: http://www.monsterwax.com/blinking.html] Monsterwax.com. Retrieved 20 November 2010.

4.	“Our Haunted History” [link to: http://www.monsterwax.com/history.html ] Monsterwax.com. Retrieved 20 November 2010.

5.	 “Terror of Tallahassee, Florida Haunted Attraction Profile” [link to: http://www.hauntworld.com/haunted_house_in_tallahassee_Florida_terror_of_tallahassee]  Hauntworld.com. Retrieved 21 November 2010.

6.	“Our Haunted History” [link to: http://www.monsterwax.com/history.html ] Monsterwax.com. Retrieved 21 November 2010.

7.	Boruch-Dolan, Cara. “Halloween is not just for football” [link to: http://www.monsterwax.com/2009FSView.html] FSView 2009-10-29.

8.	“Sunland Asylum!” [link to: http://www.monsterwax.com/sunland.html] Monsterwax.com. Retrieved 21 November 2010.

9.	Pecquet, Julian. “There’s a reason for that frightened feeling”  [link to: http://www.monsterwax.com/demarticle2005.html]  Tallahassee Democrat 2005-10-30.

10.	Norbert, Grace. “The Terror of Tallahassee haunted house gets bigger and better each year” [link to: http://www.monsterwax.com/fsview2010.html] FSView 2010-10-28.

11.	“Wanna Help Haunt?” [link to: http://www.monsterwax.com/helphaunt.html] Monsterwax.com. Retrieved 21 November 2010.

12.	“Our Haunted History” [link to: http://www.monsterwax.com/history.html ] Monsterwax.com. Retrieved 21 November 2010.

Tourist attractions in Tallahassee, Florida